The pearl of Likoma (Pseudotropheus joanjohnsonae)  is a species of fish in the family Cichlidae endemic to Lake Malawi where it is native to rocky areas around Likoma Island and it has been introduced to Thumbi West Island. This species can reach a length of  TL.  It can also be found in the aquarium trade. Males are blue, while females are a greenish blue with rows of yellowish spots and shiny gills. They feed on crustaceans, insects, and larvae.

The specific name of this species honours Joan Johnson who was editor of The Aquarist magazine in which the description of this fish was published.

See also
List of freshwater aquarium fish species

References

Pearl of Likoma
Fish of Lake Malawi
Cichlid fish of Africa
Fish described in 1974
Taxonomy articles created by Polbot
Taxobox binomials not recognized by IUCN